South Kempsey is a suburb of Kempsey in the Kempsey Shire, New South Wales, Australia. They are separated by the Macleay River.

The 2016 census listed 2302 persons within the South Kempsey area.

Heritage listings 
Kempsey has a number of heritage-listed sites, including:

 North Coast railway: Macleay River railway bridge

References

 
Kempsey Shire